Rovnoye is a rural locality (a selo) in Volkovsky Selsoviet of Blagoveshchensky District, Amur Oblast, Russia. The population was 420 as of 2018. There are 6 streets.

Geography 
Rovnoye is located 23 km east of Blagoveshchensk (the district's administrative centre) by road. Ust-Ivanovka is the nearest rural locality.

References 

Rural localities in Blagoveshchensky District, Amur Oblast